Ferguson Bay is a hamlet in Saskatchewan.

Unincorporated communities in Saskatchewan
Webb No. 138, Saskatchewan